Otto Dean Unruh (September 17, 1899 – May 19, 1992) was an American football player and coach.  In 1960, Unruh wrote the book How To Coach Winning Football and is credited with inventing the T-Wing offensive football formation, having run the play as early as 1938.  He is a member of the Kansas Sports Hall of Fame.

Playing career
Unruh played one season of basketball for the Kansas Jayhawks under head coach Phog Allen before his graduation in 1926.

Coaching career

Bethel College
Unruh was the head football coach at Bethel College  in North Newton, Kansas.  He held that position for 17 seasons, from 1929 until 1942 and again from 1967 through 1969.  His coaching record at Bethel was 53–76–6.  Bethel College honored his legacy by inducting him into the schools athletic hall of fame.

High school
In between his two times as head coach at Bethel, Unruh was a high school teacher at Clay Center Community High School in Clay Center, Kansas.  While teaching high school he was coach of both football and track teams and the high school stadium bears his name.  In 2004, the school added him to their "Hall of Fame" for his accomplishments.

Head coaching record

College football

References

External links
 

1899 births
1992 deaths
American men's basketball players
Basketball coaches from Kansas
Basketball players from Kansas
Bethel Threshers football coaches
Bethel Threshers men's basketball coaches
Kansas Jayhawks men's basketball players
College men's basketball head coaches in the United States
College tennis coaches in the United States
College track and field coaches in the United States
High school football coaches in Kansas
People from Clay Center, Kansas